The Schwarze Wand is a mountain of the Rieserferner group in South Tyrol, Italy.

References 
 Werner Beikircher: Rieserfernergruppe (Alpine Club Guide) Bergverlag Rother, 1983. 

Mountains of the Alps
Mountains of South Tyrol
Alpine three-thousanders
Rieserferner Group
Rieserferner-Ahrn Nature Park